Sacred Heart Parish - designated for Polish immigrants in Ipswich, Massachusetts, United States.

 Founded 1908. It was one of the Polish-American Roman Catholic parishes in New England in the Archdiocese of Boston.

The parish closed April 25, 1999. The building retains the original structure, but the inside has been converted into luxury apartments.

Bibliography 

 Our Lady of Czestochowa Parish - Centennial 1893-1993
 The Official Catholic Directory in USA

External links 

 Roman Catholic Archdiocese of Boston
 Closed and Merged Parishes

See also 

 Parishioners plead for Polish church - The Boston Globe
 Ipswich faithful bid adieu to church - The Boston Herald

Roman Catholic parishes of Archdiocese of Boston
Polish-American Roman Catholic parishes in Massachusetts
Buildings and structures in Ipswich, Massachusetts
Churches in Essex County, Massachusetts